The  was a waka poet and Japanese noblewoman active in the Heian period. She was a daughter of Minamoto no Toshitaka (源俊隆), making her a member of the Minamoto clan, but her given name is unknown.

Poetry 
One of her poems is included in the Ogura Hyakunin Isshu:

External links 
E-text of her poems in Japanese

Japanese poets
Minamoto clan
Japanese women poets
Hyakunin Isshu poets